E. V. Collins was an Inspector General of Police in the Gold Coast.

Collins served as the Inspector General of Police of the Ghana Police Service in the Gold Coast from 1910 until 1917. He died in office. He was on the S.S. Abosso which was sailing back to the United Kingdom on 24 April 1917 during World War I when it was hit. Other Gold Coast officials who were lost on the same ship were E. B. Reece, Treasurer, K. R. Chatfield, Provincial Engineer with the Public Works Department and J. R. Whitaker, Assistant District Commissioner.

References

1917 deaths
Ghanaian police officers
Ghanaian Inspector Generals of Police
Civilians killed in World War I
British colonial police officers
British people in the British Gold Coast